Ralph Max Alexander Kerrebijn (born 16 May 1999) is a Dutch footballer who plays as a midfielder for Gibraltar Football League side Mons Calpe.

Early life
In 2014, Kerrebijn moved to Canada. He played soccer there with the Oakville Blue Devils. While in Canada, he graduated from the Rotman Commerce program at the University of Toronto. He was a lab assistant at the BMO Finance Research and Trading Lab.

Club career
In 2021, he signed for Serbian side Žarkovo. On 14 May 2021, he debuted for Žarkovo during a 2–0 win over Trayal.

References

External links
 

Living people
1999 births
Dutch footballers
Association football midfielders
OFK Žarkovo players
FK Budućnost Dobanovci players
Serbian First League players
Dutch expatriate footballers
Dutch expatriate sportspeople in Serbia
Expatriate footballers in Serbia
Dutch emigrants to Canada
Footballers from Dordrecht
Blue Devils FC players